Shastri (also known as Darshan Shastri)  is a 2005 Kannada-language action gangster film written and directed by P. N. Sathya and produced by Anaji Nagaraj in the banner of Namana films. The film stars Darshan and Manya in lead roles. The film has a musical score by Sadhu Kokila. The film portrays the downfall of an impulsive youngster after facing betrayal in love and his further journey through crime after making his family believe that he is dead. The core storyline of the movie was heavily inspired by the 1995 classic Om. Shastri was premiered on Udaya TV Channel. The film was dubbed in Hindi as Main Hoon Yoddha .

Plot
Shastri tells the story of a medical student Shastri who becomes a victim of circumstances and is led to a life in the underworld. But he is a Good Samaritan Don who helps out the poor and depressed. In the bargain, he antagonizes many cruel dons who wants to settle scores with him. Added to this issue, there is a love angle added with Manya playing an arrogant rich girl who is spurned by Shastri earlier.

But Manya takes revenge on Shastri and is indirectly responsible for his entry into the underworld. Shastri tries to turn a new leaf into his life, but it is not possible. Finally, he is stabbed by one of his adversaries in a fight, but he survives and is later reunited with his lover.

Cast
Darshan as Rama Shastri (Shastri) 
Manya as Kanakambari (Kanaka) 
Chitra Shenoy as Kanaka's mother 
Bullet Prakash as Shastri's friend
Hanumanthe Gowda as Kanaka's father
G. K. Govinda Rao as Shastri's father 
Sathyajith as mobster

Soundtrack
Soundtrack was composed by Sadhu Kokila.
"Sumne Sumne" - Udit Narayan, Madhuvati
"Style Varevaa" - Tippu, Anuradha Sriram
"O hrudaya" - Hemanth Kumar

Release
The film will be re-released in the digital version in June 2017.

Critical reception
The film received extremely negative reviews. Indiaglitz wrote "Shastri is a badly made, poorly directed film. Its music by Sadhu Kokila is also poor and even the photography can not be spoken about in an appreciating measure. Vigilant fans will find the film just a hotch potch of many non Kannada films." Rediff called it "badly made and poorly directed".

References

Indian crime action films
2000s crime action films
Films about organised crime in India
Indian gangster films
2000s masala films
2000s Kannada-language films